Cerithiopsis fayalensis is a species of sea snail, a gastropod in the family Cerithiopsidae, which is known from the southwestern coast of Apulia, Italy. It was described by Watson in 1880.

References

fayalensis
Gastropods described in 1880